Command Decision is a 1949 war film released by Metro-Goldwyn-Mayer starring Clark Gable, Walter Pidgeon, Van Johnson, and Brian Donlevy, and directed by Sam Wood, based on the 1948 stage play of the same name written by William Wister Haines, which he based on his best-selling 1947 novel. The screenplay for the film was written by George Froeschel and William R. Laidlaw. Haines' play ran on Broadway for almost a year beginning in October 1947.

Although portraying the strategic bombing of Nazi Germany in World War II, the main action takes place almost entirely within the confines of the headquarters of its protagonist. Depicting the political infighting of conducting a major war effort, the film's major theme is the emotional toll on commanders from ordering missions that result in high casualties, the effects of sustained combat on all concerned, and the nature of accountability for its consequences.

Plot

In 1943, at the Ministry of Information in London, war correspondents Elmer "Brockie" Brockhurst (Charles Bickford) and James Carwood (John Ridgely) of United News attend the daily briefing on bombing missions. While the RAF representative announces light losses, the PRO of the Eighth Air Force causes grumbling when his report reveals a record 48 bombers shot down bombing an undisclosed industrial target. Carwood questions whether any target could be worth such losses, but Brockhurst retorts that the U.S. 5th Bomb Division commander, Brig. Gen. "Casey" Dennis (Clark Gable), loves the war. Brockhurst travels to the base of the 32nd Bomb Group, where Dennis has his headquarters, and observes B-17s taking off on another major strike. He tries to milk information about the arrest of a decorated (and highly publicized) pilot, Captain Jenks, from T/Sgt. Evans (Van Johnson), an assistant in Dennis's office, but Evans cordially rebuffs him.

Dennis has an unexpected public relations crisis on his hands as his superior, Maj. Gen. Kane (Walter Pidgeon), visits at the same time, bringing Brig. Gen. Clifton Garnet (Brian Donlevy) with him. Garnet, a West Point classmate of Dennis and brother-in-law to bomb group commander Col. Ted Martin (John Hodiak), has stirred speculation that he has been sent by the Pentagon to replace either Kane or Dennis in command. Kane's headquarters also reports that a visiting congressional committee is due, while Garnet pleads for low loss missions because a Global Allocation conference at the Pentagon in three days might curtail more bombers.

Dennis and Brockhurst, old antagonists in conflicts between the military and the press, clash again. Kane tries to ameliorate, but when Dennis identifies the targets as Posenleben and Schweinhafen, Kane realizes Dennis has begun Operation Stitch in Kane's absence. The return of the day's mission interrupts. Losses are more severe than even the day before and Brockhurst cautions against a cover-up. Although the 32nd has been decimated, Martin has returned, bearing the bad news that his group attacked the wrong target. As Dennis's closest friend, Martin urges him to keep quiet because the two cities are indistinguishable. When Dennis instead reveals to Kane that the target struck was a torpedo factory, both Kane and Garnet see an opportunity to promote the mistake as cooperation with the U.S. Navy. Brockhurst learns about the mistake. To gain his cooperation, Kane decides to trust him with the top secret information that Operation Stitch seeks to destroy factories building a German jet fighter before it can go into service and crush American strategic bombing. A third city, Fendelhorst, must also be attacked, and Dennis's is the only bomb division able to reach these targets beyond the range of escorting U.S. fighters. A rare stretch of clear weather, about to end, presents an opportunity to complete the operation before the Luftwaffe can mount an impenetrable defense.

Kane denies permission to attack Schweinhafen again but Dennis blackmails him by threatening to prefer charges against Capt. Jenks, whose uncle is Congressman Malcolm (Edward Arnold) of the visiting Military Affairs Committee. Kane gives permission to continue Stitch while Dennis agrees to award Jenks (who refused to fly the mission to Schweinhafen) a medal during Malcolm's visit. While Kane wines and dines the Committee, Garnet offers Martin the job of chief of staff (and a promotion) in the B-29 command in the Pacific that Garnet believes he is in line for, unbeknownst to Dennis.

The next day the Committee is impressed by the takeoff of the mission, led by Martin, but back in headquarters, Malcolm bitterly accuses Dennis of recklessly causing heavy losses. As tensions rise, Evans uses political savvy to ease the situation. Martin sends the signal that Schweinhafen has been destroyed, but during the ceremony to decorate Jenks, Dennis is brought a message that Martin's B-17 (and the crew of Capt. Jenks) is shot down. Malcolm renews his tirade against Dennis. Jenks unexpectedly tells his uncle to shut up and refuses his medal. Dennis, emotionally shaken by Martin's death, excuses himself to plan tomorrow's mission. Kane is shocked that despite everything, Dennis plans to hit the final German jet factory target Fendelhorst. Kane relieves Dennis of command and replaces him with Garnet. While Garnet queries his staff about ordering an easy mission for the next day, he comes to the realization that Dennis hated every minute of his duties. Garnet makes the command decision to attack Fendelhorst while the weather permits. Dennis looks forward to a training command in the United States, where he can be near his family, but a message from the Pentagon orders him to the Pacific and the new B-29 command. Brockhurst, their differences ended by all he has observed, wishes Dennis well as he boards his aircraft.

Cast

 Clark Gable as Brig. Gen. K.C. "Casey" Dennis
 Walter Pidgeon as Maj. Gen. Roland Goodlaw Kane
 Van Johnson as T/Sgt. Immanuel T. Evans
 Brian Donlevy as Brig. Gen. Clifton I. Garnet
 Charles Bickford as Elmer Brockhurst
 John Hodiak as Col. Edward Rayton "Ted" Martin
 Edward Arnold as Congressman Arthur Malcolm
 Marshall Thompson as Capt. George Washington Bellpepper Lee
 Richard Quine as Maj. George Rockton
 Cameron Mitchell as Lt. Ansel Goldberg
 Clinton Sundberg as Maj. Homer V. Prescott
 Ray Collins as Maj. Desmond Lansing
 Warner Anderson as Col. Earnest Haley
 John McIntire as Maj. Belding Davis
 Moroni Olsen as Congressman Stone
 John Ridgely as James Carwood
 Michael Steele as Capt. Lucius Jenks
 Edward Earle as Congressman Watson
 Mack Williams as  Lt. Col. Virgil Jackson
 James Millican as  Maj. Garrett Davenport

Production

Clark Gable joined the Army Air Forces during World War II shortly after the death of his wife Carole Lombard in an aircraft crash, following a bond drive.  He was promoted from lieutenant to major and flew five combat bombing missions from England in B-17s as a waist gunner, receiving the Distinguished Flying Cross and the Air Medal.  Cameron Mitchell, who plays bombardier Lt. Goldberg, was also a bombardier during the war.

On the basis of his stage performance as Technical Sergeant Evans in the Broadway production of Command Decision, James Whitmore was contracted to MGM, although Van Johnson played the role in the film.  Barry Nelson provided the uncredited radio voice ("Cumquat B-Baker") of B-17 pilot bringing in his bomber after a raid with wounded aboard.

MGM bought the rights to William Wister Haines' 1947 novel Command Decision at the behest of Clark Gable, who saw in it a starring role for himself.  MGM paid a $100,000 down payment, which would escalate to $300,000 if the novel were staged as a play by October 1947.  In the event, the play opened on Broadway on October 1 of that year.

Before filming began, Robert Taylor and Tom Drake had been expected to play roles in the film.  Command Decision was in production from April 13–June 23, 1948, although principal photography began on April 24, 1948 at March Air Force Base. A single location shot was included in the final print, in which Dennis sees Martin off on the fatal mission. Due to the availability of two privately owned B-17s, the scene was shot at San Fernando Valley Airport in Van Nuys, California.

The film uses extensive cuts of archived footage shot during the war, but all of it is of the many varied aspects of mission preparation, takeoffs and landings. Except for the sequence under the opening credits, of bomber formations leaving voluminous contrails and then dropping bombs, no combat footage is used in the movie. Only two exteriors were used, of Brockhurst driving up to the main gate of the base in a jeep, and of Martin saying farewell to Dennis at his bomber's dispersal hardstand, totalling little more than a minute of film. The film's only action scene involves closeups of Dennis "talking down" a bomber piloted by a bombardier.

Director Sam Wood acknowledged the limitations of filming a stage play, shooting all scenes from a "relentlessly ground level", and used master shots and single-camera group shots that allowed the actors to use the choreography of the theatrical play to establish dramatic and moral relationships.

Reception
The premiere of Command Decision took place in Los Angeles on December 25, 1948, and the film went into general release in February 1949. The premiere in Washington D.C., which took place sometime in February, was attended by Vice President Alben W. Barkley, Secretary of State Dean Acheson, U.S. Air Force Chief of Staff General Hoyt S. Vandenberg and other dignitaries.

Command Decision was successful at the box office in 1949 earning $2,901,000 in the US and Canada and $784,000 elsewhere. However, due to its high cost, MGM recorded a loss of $130,000 on the movie.

It was named as one of the ten best films of 1948 by The New York Times and by Film Daily. Critical review centered on the key dramatic elements of the film, especially concerning the human factors involved in making command decisions. Bosley Crowther noted: "... it is the performance of Clark Gable in this scene of a soldier's momentary grieving that tests his competence in the leading role. For this is not only the least likely but it is the most sentimental moment in the film, and the fact that Mr. Gable takes it with dignity and restraint bespeaks his worth. Otherwise, he makes of General Dennis a smart, tough, straight-shooting man, disciplinary yet human and a "right guy" to have in command."  Still, there were other reactions: in August 1949, the Los Angeles Times reported that a syndicated British film reviewer had called the film an "insult to British audiences" on the basis that it gave the audience the idea that American precision bombing had won the war. The film, however, did not make such a claim, though it did place perhaps an inordinate emphasis on strategic bombing. The long speeches by General Kane (Walter Pidgeon) and General Dennis (Clark Gable) in their dinner meeting in the middle of the film are some of the best expositions of grand strategy in any of the Second World War films. Those speeches along with a rather interesting (and somewhat humorous) interlude by the intelligence officer (ably played by Ray Collins - later Lieutenant Tragg in the Perry Mason TV series) all make for very informative illustrations for students and others interested in strategic leadership.

The film did not receive any awards, although writers William Laidlaw and George Froeschel were nominated for two Writers Guild Awards, for "Best Written American Drama" and the Robert Meltzer Award for the "Screenplay Dealing Most Ably with Problems of the American Scene".

Adaptation
On March 3, 1949, Clark Gable, Van Johnson, Walter Pidgeon, Brian Donlevy, John Hodiak, Edward Arnold and Richard Quine reprised their film roles in a 30-minute radio version of Command Decision for the NBC radio network program Screen Guild Theater, the first pre-recorded commercial show to be broadcast over the network from Hollywood.

Home media
Command Decision was released on DVD on June 5, 2007 in the United States.

References

Explanatory notes

Citations

Bibliography

 Carlson, Mark. Flying on Film: A Century of Aviation in the Movies, 1912–2012. Duncan, Oklahoma: BearManor Media, 2012. .
 Evans, Alun. Brassey's Guide to War Films. Dulles, Virginia: Potomac Books, 2000. .
 Haines, William Wister. Command Decision: Five Great Classic Stories of World War II. New York: Dodd, Mead, 1980. .
 Hardwick, Jack and Ed Schnepf. "A Viewer's Guide to Aviation Movies". The Making of the Great Aviation Films, General Aviation Series, Volume 2, 1989.
 Maltin, Leonard. Leonard Maltin's Movie Guide 2009. New York: New American Library, 2009 (originally published as TV Movies, then Leonard Maltin’s Movie & Video Guide), First edition 1969, published annually since 1988. .
 Orriss, Bruce. When Hollywood Ruled the Skies: The Aviation Film Classics of World War II. Hawthorne, California: Aero Associates Inc., 1984. .
 Parish, James Robert. The Great Combat Pictures: Twentieth-Century Warfare on the Screen. Metuchen, New Jersey: The Scarecrow Press, 1990. .
  Reid, John Howard. "The Top Movies of 1949". Success in the Cinema: Money-Making Movies and Critics' Choices.  Raleigh, North Carolina: Lulu.com, 2006. .

External links

 
 
 
 
 DVD Verdict review, Command Decision
 Archived broadcast of Screen Guild Theater radio play of Command Decision

American aviation films
American black-and-white films
Metro-Goldwyn-Mayer films
American films based on plays
Films directed by Sam Wood
American World War II films
Films about the United States Army Air Forces
Films scored by Miklós Rózsa
Films set in London
American war drama films
1940s war drama films
1940s American films